An heirloom plant, heirloom variety, heritage fruit (Australia and New Zealand), or heirloom vegetable (especially in Ireland and the UK) is an old cultivar of a plant used for food that is grown and maintained by gardeners and farmers, particularly in isolated or ethnic minority communities of the Western world. These were commonly grown during earlier periods in human history, but are not used in modern large-scale agriculture.

In some parts of the world, it is illegal to sell seeds of cultivars that are not listed as approved for sale. The Henry Doubleday Research Association, now known as Garden Organic, responded to this legislation by setting up the Heritage Seed Library to preserve seeds of as many of the older cultivars as possible. However, seed banks alone have not been able to provide sufficient insurance against catastrophic loss. In some jurisdictions, like Colombia, laws have been proposed that would make seed saving itself illegal.

Many heirloom vegetables have kept their traits through open pollination, while fruit varieties such as apples have been propagated over the centuries through grafts and cuttings. The trend of growing heirloom plants in gardens has been returning in popularity in North America and Europe.

Origin

Before the industrialization of agriculture, a much wider variety of plant foods were grown for human consumption, largely due to farmers and gardeners saving seeds and cuttings for future planting. From the 16th century through the early 20th centuries, the diversity was huge. Old nursery catalogues were filled with plums, peaches, pears and apples of numerous varieties and seed catalogs offered legions of vegetable varieties. Valuable and carefully selected seeds were sold and traded using these catalogs along with useful advice on cultivation. Since World War II, agriculture in the industrialized world has mostly consisted of food crops which are grown in large, monocultural plots. In order to maximize consistency, few varieties of each type of crop are grown. These varieties are often selected for their productivity and their ability to ripen at the same time while withstanding mechanical picking and cross-country shipping, as well as their tolerance to drought, frost, or pesticides. This form of agriculture has led to a 75% drop in crop genetic diversity.

While heirloom gardening has maintained a niche community, in recent years it has seen a resurgence in response to the industrial agriculture trend. In the Global South, heirloom plants are still widely grown, for example, in the home gardens of South and Southeast Asia. Before World War II, the majority of produce grown in the United States was heirlooms.

In the 21st century, numerous community groups all over the world are working to preserve historic varieties to make a wide variety of fruits, vegetables, herbs, and flowers available again to the home gardener, by renovating old orchards, sourcing historic fruit varieties, engaging in seed swaps, and encouraging community participation.

Requirements

The definition and use of the word heirloom to describe plants is fiercely debated.

One school of thought places an age or date point on the cultivars.  For instance, one school says the cultivar must be over 100 years old, others 50 years, and others prefer the date of 1945, which marks the end of World War II and roughly the beginning of widespread hybrid use by growers and seed companies.  Many gardeners consider 1951 to be the latest year a plant could have originated and still be called an heirloom, since that year marked the widespread introduction of the first hybrid varieties. It was in the 1970s that hybrid seeds began to proliferate in the commercial seed trade. Some heirloom varieties are much older; some are apparently pre-historic.

Another way of defining heirloom cultivars is to use the definition of the word heirloom in its truest sense.  Under this interpretation, a true heirloom is a cultivar that has been nurtured, selected, and handed down from one family member to another for many generations.

Additionally, there is another category of cultivars that could be classified as "commercial heirlooms": cultivars that were introduced many generations ago and were of such merit that they have been saved, maintained and handed down—even if the seed company has gone out of business or otherwise dropped the line.  Additionally, many old commercial releases have actually been family heirlooms that a seed company obtained and introduced.

Regardless of a person's specific interpretation, most authorities agree that heirlooms, by definition, must be open-pollinated.  They may also be open-pollinated varieties that were bred and stabilized using classic breeding practices.  While there are no genetically modified tomatoes available for commercial or home use, it is generally agreed that no genetically modified organisms can be considered heirloom cultivars. Another important point of discussion is that without the ongoing growing and storage of heirloom plants, the seed companies and the government will control all seed distribution. Most, if not all, hybrid plants, if they don't have sterile seeds and can be regrown, will not be the same as the original hybrid plant, thus ensuring the dependency on seed distributors for future crops.

Collection sites

The heritage fruit trees that exist today are clonally descended from trees of antiquity. Heirloom roses are sometimes collected (nondestructively as small cuttings) from vintage homes and from cemeteries, where they were once planted at gravesites by mourners and left undisturbed in the decades since. Modern production methods and the rise in population have largely supplanted this practice.

UK and EU law and national lists

In the UK and Europe, it is thought that many heritage vegetable varieties (perhaps over 2,000) have been lost since the 1970s, when EEC (now EU) laws were passed making it illegal to sell any vegetable cultivar not on the national list of any EEC country. This was set up to help in eliminating seed suppliers selling one seed as another, guarantee the seeds were true to type, and that they germinated consistently. Thus, there were stringent tests to assess varieties, with a view to ensuring they remain the same from one generation to the next.

These tests (called DUS) assess "distinctness", "uniformity", and "stability". But since some heritage cultivars are not necessarily uniform from plant to plant, or indeed within a single plant—a single cultivar—this has been a sticking point. "Distinctness" has been a problem, moreover, because many cultivars have several names, perhaps coming from different areas or countries (e.g., carrot cultivar Long Surrey Red is also known as "Red Intermediate", "St. Valery", and "Chertsey"). However, it has been ascertained that some of these varieties that look similar are in fact different cultivars. On the other hand, two that were known to be different cultivars were almost identical to each other, thus one would be dropped from the national list in order to clean it up.

Another problem has been the fact that it is somewhat expensive to register and then maintain a cultivar on a national list. Therefore, if no seed breeder or supplier thinks it will sell well, no one will maintain it on a list, and so the seed will not be re-bred by commercial seed breeders.

In recent years, progress has been made in the UK to set up allowances and less stringent tests for heritage varieties on a B national list, but this is still under consideration.

When heirloom plants are not being sold, however, laws are often more lenient. Because most heirloom plants are at least 50 years old and grown and swapped in a family or community they fall under the public domain. Another worldwide alternative is to submit heirloom seeds to a seedbank. These public repositories in turn maintain and disperse these genetics to anyone who will use them appropriately. Typically, approved uses are breeding, study, and sometimes, further distribution.

US state law

There are a variety of intellectual property protections and laws that are applied to heirloom seeds, which can often differ greatly between states. Plant patents are based on the Plant Patent Act of 1930, which protects plants grown from cuttings and division, while under intellectual property rights, the Plant Variety Protection Act of 1970 (PVPA) shields non-hybrid, seed-propagated plants. However, seed breeders can only shelter their variety for 20 years under PVPA. There are also a couple of exceptions under the PVPA which allow growers to cultivate, save seeds, and sell the resultant crops, and give breeders allowances to use PVPA protected varieties as starter material as long as it constitutes less than half of the breeding material. There are also seed licenses which may place restrictions on the use of seeds or trademarks that guard against the use of certain plant variety names.

In 2014, the Pennsylvania Department of Agriculture caused a seed-lending library to shut down and promised to curtail any similar efforts in the state. The lending library, hosted by a town library, allowed gardeners to "check out" a package of open-pollinated seed, and "return" seeds kept from the crop grown from those seeds. The Department of Agriculture said that this activity raises the possibility of "agro-terrorism", and that a Seed Act of 2004 requires the library staff to test each seed packet for germination rate and whether the seed was true to type. In 2016 the department reversed this decision, and clarified that seed libraries and non-commercial seed exchanges are not subject to the requirements of the Seed Act.

Future 
As the effects of climate change intensify and the world population rises, more attention is being put on heirloom plants as a way to restore genetic diversity and feed a growing population while safeguarding the food supply of diverse regions. Specific heirloom plants are often selected, saved, and planted again because of their superior performance in a particular locality. Over many crop cycles these plants develop unique adaptive qualities to their environment, which empowers local communities and can be vital to maintaining the genetic resources of the world.

Examples

 Bhutanese red rice
 Black rice
 Heirloom tomato

See also

 Ark of Taste
 Biodiversity
 Community gardening
 History of gardening
 Association Kokopelli
 Landrace
 List of organic gardening and farming topics
 Local food
 Orthodox seed
 Rare breed
 Recalcitrant seed
 Seed saving
 Seedbank
 Slow Food
 Kyoyasai, a specific class of Japanese heirloom vegetables originating around Kyoto, Japan.

References

Further reading

External links
 What is an heirloom vegetable? 
 Heirloom Vegetables from the Home and Garden Information Center at Clemson University
 FAO/IAEA Programme Mutant Variety Database
 FDA Statement of Policy - Foods Derived from New Plant Varieties
 DEFRA - Plant varieties and seeds

Domesticated plants
Garden plants
Biodiversity
Rare breed conservation